Linnea Olsson is a Swedish singer-songwriter and multi-instrumentalist, best known and acclaimed as a cellist.  A former member of the band Isildurs Bane, she released her first album, Ah!, in 2012, followed by a second album Breaking and Shaking in 2014. She was, with Jennie Abrahamson, the opening act and touring cellist for Peter Gabriel's Back to Front Tour running from 2012 through to the end of 2014.

She was the singer for the 2019 rhythm-action video game Sayonara Wild Hearts, with music composed by Daniel Olsén and Jonathan Eng.

Discography

Albums
2012: Ah! (Götterfunk Produktion)
2014: Breaking and Shaking (Götterfunk Produktions, Sony)
2017: For Show (Götterfunk Produktions)
2019: Sayonara Wild Hearts (Simogo AB)

References

External links

 

Year of birth missing (living people)
Living people
21st-century Swedish singers
Alternative rock singers
Avant-garde singers
Swedish cellists
Women cellists
21st-century women musicians
21st-century cellists